is the first full-length studio album by Japanese Idol unit 3776, released on October 28, 2015.

The total duration of the album is 3776 seconds, which is the altitude of Mt. Fuji in meters. The concept is to climb Fuji with singer Chiyo Ide as a navigator.

Reception
Music writer Kazumi Nanba selected this album as the best Japanese idol album of 2015.
Rock musician Yuusuke Koide said "When we talk about the best album of 2015, I say this is the best. Not only idol music, but also rock, pop... Some people say - for example - Adel is the best. But I say 3776's album is the best of all. If there are few people who agree with me, the reason is that few people have listened to this album."

Live Performance
In July 2018, 3776 performed this album completely in Fujinomiya City and Tokyo.
Live in Fujinomiya was released as DVD. In Tokyo was released as BD-R.
On December 29, 2018, a video and live performance mix based on this album was performed at a movie theater in Shinjuku, Tokyo.

Track listing
All tracks composed by Akira Ishida.

[Introduction]

[IntervalA]

[IntervalB]

 
[IntervalC]

 
 
[IntervalD] 
 
[IntervalE] 
 
[IntervalF] 
 
3.11 
[Ending]

Personnel
Chiyono Ide - vocals
Akira Ishida - guitars, programming, etc.

References

External links
 3776 - 3776を聴かない理由があるとすれば (2015, CD) at Discogs

2015 albums
Art pop albums
Pop albums by Japanese artists
Alternative rock albums by Japanese artists
Progressive rock albums by Japanese artists